Alcis scortea is a moth of the  family Geometridae. It is found in Taiwan.

The wingspan is 26–33 mm. Adults are on wing in February.

References

Moths described in 1909
Boarmiini
Moths of Taiwan